Norah Royce Docker, Lady Docker (23 June 190611 December 1983) was an English socialite. A dance hostess at a club in her youth, she married three times, on each occasion to an executive of a business that sold luxury goods. 

Her third marriage, to Sir Bernard Docker, the chairman of Birmingham Small Arms Company (BSA) and its subsidiary, Daimler, was notable for the couple's extravagant lifestyle. This was often funded by tax writeoffs and company expenditure that could not be legitimately defended, which led to Sir Bernard's removal from BSA's board of directors. 

She was also banned from Monaco by Prince Rainier after an incident in which she tore up a Monegasque flag.

Early life
She was born in Derby in 1906 as Norah Royce Turner to Sydney and Amy Turner. She was the second eldest of four children: Bernice, her older sister by two years, Alma was six years younger, and brother Royce, the youngest. The Turners moved to Birmingham, where her father bought into a car dealership. Her father committed suicide when she was 16, and she was the last to see her father alive.

As a young woman, she became a dance hostess at London’s Cafe de Paris. She was courted by three men simultaneously, known as "The Judge, the Duke and the Frenchman" in her autobiography. 'The Judge' was Cecil Whiteley and 'The Duke' was the Ninth Duke of Marlborough. She had an affair with Clement Callingham and moved into his house while his divorce from his wife, Pamela, was being settled. Clement was a millionaire, the chairman of Henekeys whisky. Docker married Clement at the Chelsea Registry Office as soon as his divorce became absolute.

Book
Her autobiography, Norah: The Autobiography of Lady Docker, was ghostwritten and edited by Showbusiness columnist Don Short. It is the only authorised book about Norah Docker. It was published by WH Allen in 1969. The introduction reads: "At least I have not attempted to conceal anything from you and my conscience is calm, for I have told all with honesty. All I ask is that you judge me with the same honesty. And, finally, a word of apology to those thousands of people whose names I would like to have mentioned in this book: but just think of those thousands more who will feel greatly relieved when they find they have been left out..."

Marriages
She was married three times. The first, to Clement Callingham from 1938 until his death in 1945, resulted in one son, Lance. 

The second, in 1946, to Sir William Collins, the president of Fortnum & Mason, lasted until his death in 1948.

The third, in 1949, was to Sir Bernard Docker, chairman of Birmingham Small Arms Company owner of Daimler, and a director of the Midland Bank, Anglo-Argentine Tramways Company and Thomas Cook and Son.

Public life
Lady Docker loved publicity. "My close friends in Fleet Street have told me that I have been good entertainment value for money, for their millions of readers over the years, and frankly I have never objected!" 

In the summer of 1954, after a visit to Water Haigh colliery at Woodlesford near Leeds,  Lady Docker invited several of the miners to a champagne party on the Dockers' yacht, Shemara, at which she danced the hornpipe. The image was used for the front cover of the Autobiography in 1969.

Lady Docker won a marbles championship in 1955 at Castleford's "Reight Neet Aht", a charity event for the Cancer Relief Fund, while wearing a sequin dress and diamonds. The match was rigged, the other players having been instructed to let her win. The next year, while in Melbourne, Australia, to watch the 1956 Summer Olympics, she challenged the suburb of Collingwood to a marbles match.

In 1969, her memoirs, Norah: The Autobiography of Lady Docker, ghostwritten and edited by Don Short, were published by W.H. Allen. One part reads: "I have planted my feet, delicately but boldly, on red carpets in the palaces and castles of some of the most sacred dynasties across the world. Sometimes I was also bowled straight back down those same carpets."

Jewel thefts
When the Dockers moved to Mayfair, there was a series of jewel thefts. To protect her maid Charlotte Reed, Norah converted the bidet in her bathroom into a stool in which to store her jewellery. After that, Norah discovered they had been robbed. The police were alerted, and became suspicious of Reed. They drove her away in a police car and dug up the garden in her sister's home in Ruislip.

Docker Daimlers

In ‘Norah: The Autobiography of Lady Docker’, ‘The Golden Daimler’ is given its own chapter. ‘If I could find a single reason for my elevation to the dubious ranks of a celebrity, then I think, I would have a motor car to thank.’ She told her husband Sir Bernard Docker of her frustration that no one abroad had heard of Daimler cars. To boost the car’s popularity, she asked Bernard: “Why can’t you manufacture a smaller Daimler, suitable for the family?” Bernard invited her to join the company and to take on the project.

1951 – The Gold Car (a.k.a. Golden Daimler)
The Gold Car was a touring limousine on the Thirty-Six Straight-Eight chassis. The car was covered with 7,000 tiny gold stars, and all plating that would normally have been chrome was gold. This car was taken to Paris, the United States and Australia. 

The car was sold in 1959 for seven thousand, three hundred pounds, to an American motor-cycle distributor, William E. Johnson, Junior, of Pasadena. In her Autobiography, Norah says: ‘Unfortunately, the golden Daimler reached him stripped of its gold leaf - there was a Government order in force forbidding the export of gold. I can’t imagine they would have had much trouble in removing the gold. I found that I could scape it off with my fingernail, it was that thin.’

1952 – Blue Clover
Also on the Thirty-Six Straight-Eight chassis, Blue Clover was a two-door sportsman's coupé 
1953 – Silver Flash
The Silver Flash was an aluminium-bodied coupé based on the 3-litre Regency chassis. Its accessories included solid silver hairbrushes and red fitted luggage made from crocodile skin.

The initial plans were for a two seater sports car, in a deep green with the interior trim scarlet crocodile. But Norah Docker was told it looked terrible. At the last minute, she instructed it to be resprayed in a metallic blue-grey. When asked for the name by a journalist, she went blank, before announcing it was called ‘Silver Flash.’

1954 – Star Dust
based on the DF400 chassis 
Norah delivered it to the Hooper stand at Earls Court with silver stars embossed over the dark blue bodywork. It had chrome fittings with crocodile interior and silver brocade seating.

1955 – Golden Zebra
The Golden Zebra was a two-door coupé based on the DK400 chassis. 

It was a cream and gold, fixed head sports car, with an ivory dashboard, cocktail cabinet, vanity box and built-in picnic basket. There was an ivory collapsible umbrella among the accessories. Lady Norah Docker’s initials were inscribed in gold letters on the door, and they had a gold replica of a zebra on the bonnet. The upholstery inside the car was real zebra-skin. ‘“Zebra?” questioned astonished reporters. “Yes,” I retorted. “It’s the best skin, because mink is too hot to sit on.” My answer was quoted all over the world, and it became the most famous of all my aphorisms.’

Alongside the show cars kept for her personal use, Lady Docker also owned other Daimler cars, including an unmodified Conquest drophead coupé.

The Shemara
The Shemara yacht is also given its own chapter in the Autobiography. ‘We were very proud of the Shemara’s service. We could comfortably accommodate twelve people in the four double, and four single, cabins.’ The crew would often buy Norah dolls to help with her collection, and fluffy animals. ‘They gave our lounge a lot of the colour that was missing,’ she explained in her Autobiography. The Shemara could take on supplies and stores for six months’ sailing. Norah offered to sell the Shemara to Mr Onassis but he replied that he couldn’t think where to moor her. It was sold to a city property developer who offered £290,000. He claimed to have found defects aboard the Shemara which would cost £100,000 to put right. The Dockers contested it and the case went to High Court who ruled in the Dockers’ favour, saying they could only find one minor fault costing £100 to repair.

Separation from BSA
At the end of May 1956, Sir Bernard Docker was removed from the board of Birmingham Small Arms Company (BSA), where he had been chairman.

The issues leading to the removal of the Dockers stemmed from the extravagant expenses they presented to the company, including the show cars made available for Lady Docker's personal use, a £5,000 gold and mink ensemble that Lady Docker wore at the 1956 Paris Motor Show that she tried to write off as a business expense as she "was only acting as a model" at the show, and Glandyfi Castle, bought with £12,500 of BSA's money and refurbished for £25,000, again with company money.

Lady Norah Docker shared the story in the chapter titled, ‘The B.S.A. Affair’ in the Autobiography: ‘Bernard sent out over ten thousand telegrams to share-holders, promising that they would know the full and honest facts behind his dismissal. Later, I despatched a letter, together with a photograph of myself (because I was foolish enough to believe people liked me!) to another seventeen thousand shareholders.’ The letter included Norah’s defence of her actions. ‘I have done all I can to help publicise the Company’s products, especially Daimler cars. There has been criticism of what I have done, but I would like the shareholders to know that I have received no financial benefit, in anyway whatsoever, for what I have done. I believe I did a very good job.’

Prince Rainier and Monte Carlo feud
In 1956, the Dockers were invited to the wedding of Prince Rainier and Princess Grace. On the morning of the wedding, the Dockers left for the Cathedral in the Silver Stardust Daimler. But they were told to abandon the car and go to the Cathedral by bus. Norah refused and Bernard got one of the few taxis available to take them to the wedding. Norah reported on the wedding in the New York Herald Tribune and the London Sunday Graphic. In her autobiography, she wrote, "I found it difficult to gloss over the truth. I condemned the commercialisation of the wedding and, in one article, I criticised Princess Grace, on a fashion count, for wearing a ridiculously-large brimmed hat on her arrival in Monaco."   

She went to the Casino with Bernard and Lance instead. She saw the stage was empty and grabbed the microphone and said some unkind things about Prince Rainier and his former girlfriend, Gisele Pascal. "Fortunately, the club was empty apart from Bernard and Lance, a couple of isolated customers and the odd waiter." The next day over lunch in the Hotel de Paris, Norah told Bernard she wanted to leave and go to Cannes immediately. In the centre of their table, there was a crepe paper Monegasque flag and she tore it up. The following day, Norah learned she was banned from Monaco, and all the states along the French Riviera. Bernard, who had returned to London for a business meeting, went to rescue Norah but he was detained at Nice Airport on his arrival. He told officials that he was there to collect his wife and stepson, who then let him through.

Decline
Without their main source of income, the Dockers began to run out of money. In 1966, they sold their estate in Hampshire and moved to Jersey in the Channel Islands, becoming tax exiles. In the Autobiography, Norah explained her isolation. 'Now we feel alone in this world, long since forgotten by those we helped, with only a handful of true and trusted friends remaining.' 'It is sad to say, after all that has happened, that the world has become a lonely place for us. Those who professed to be our friends, stayed only as long as the apple looked inviting. Then they disappeared.'

Death
Lady Docker died on 11 December 1983, aged 77, in the Great Western Royal Hotel in London. She is buried in the churchyard of St. James-the-Less in Stubbings, near Maidenhead.

References

Sources

External links
 ‘The Autobiography of Lady Docker’ published by WH Allen. 
 Lady Docker at the National Portrait Gallery
 Lady Docker in Star Dust 1954
 The Golden Daimler 1951
 Silver Flash 1967
 re-sprayed Silver Flash 1974
 Star Dust 1954

1906 births
1983 deaths
Daimler people
English socialites
People from Derby
Wives of knights